Owen Lucas Bevan (born 26 October 2003) is a Welsh professional footballer who plays as centre-back for  club Yeovil Town on loan from AFC Bournemouth. He is a Wales under-21 international.

Personal life
Born in Winchester, and raised in Fair Oak, Hampshire Bevan qualifies for Wales through his mother, Katy. His father, Lester Bevan, is a boxing coach. Owen’s brother Taylor Bevan is a former English amateur boxing champion who represented Wales at the 2022 Commonwealth Games, winning the silver medal in the men's light heavyweight event.

Career
Bevan joined the youth academy at AFC Bournemouth when he was nine years old. He did play as a central midfielder but moved to defence aged 14. He was appointed as the captain of Bournemouth under-18s for the 2021–22 season. He joined Truro City on loan in January 2022. Having initially signed a professional contract for the first time in March 2021, Bevan was offered a new contact with Bournemouth in May 2022.

Bevan was given the number 35 shirt ahead of the 2022–23 season, and featured for the Bournemouth first team for the first time during a pre-season friendly against Real Sociedad. On 23 August 2022, Bevan made his professional debut for AFC Bournemouth during a win on penalties over Norwich City in the League Cup.

On 2 September 2022, Bevan joined National League side Yeovil Town on loan until the end of the 2022–23 season.

International career
Bevan was called up to the Wales national under-19 football team for the 2022 UEFA European Under-19 Championship Group 10 qualifying matches in Norway against Georgia, Norway and Kosovo on 6, 9 and 12 October 2021. In September 2022 Bevan made his debut for the Wales national under-21 football team in the 2-0 friendly match defeat against Austria under-21.

Career statistics

References

External links
 

2003 births
Living people
English people of Welsh descent
Sportspeople from Winchester
Welsh footballers
English footballers
Wales youth international footballers
Wales under-21 international footballers
Premier League players
Southern Football League players
AFC Bournemouth players
Truro City F.C. players
Yeovil Town F.C. players